The Law Minister of Pakistan heads the Ministry of Law and Justice. They serves in the cabinet of the Prime Minister.

List of ministers 

Jogendra Nath Mandal (1947–1951)
Pirzada Abdus Sattar Abdur Rahman (1951–1953)
A.K. Brohi (1953–1954)
Huseyn Shaheed Suhrawardy (1954–1955)
I. I. Chundrigar (1955–1957)
Muhammad Ibrahim (1958–1962)
Muhammad Munir (1962–1963)
Khurshid Ahmad (1963–1965)
Syed Muhammed Zafar (1965–1969)
Alvin Robert Cornelius (1969–1971)
Mahmud Ali Kasuri (1971–1973)
Malik Meraj Khalid (1973–1975)
Abdul Hafeez Pirzada (1975–1977)
Malik Mohammad Akhtar (1976–1977)
Syed Sharifuddin Pirzada (1977–1985)
Iqbal Ahmad Khan (1985–1986)
Wasim Sajjad (1987–1988)
Aitzaz Ahsan (1989)
Iftikhar Gilani (1989–1990)
Syed Fakhr Imam (1990–1991)
Chaudhry Abdul Gafoor (1991–1993)
Abdul Shakoor-ul Salam (1993–1994)
Iqbar Haider (1994–1995)
N.D. Khan (1995–1997)
Khalid Anwer (1997–1999)
Aziz A. Munshi (2000–2001)
Shahida Jamil (2001–2002) [1st female]
Mohammad Raza Hayat Harraj (2003–2004)
Khalid Ranjha (2004–2005)
Wasi Zafar (2006–2007)
Zahid Hamid (2007)
Chaudhry Shahid Akram Bhinder (2007–2008)
Babar Awan (2008–2011)
Mola Baksh Chandio (Senator) (2011–2012)
Farooq Naek (2012–2013)
Zahid Hamid (2013)
Ahmer Bilal Soofi (2013)
Pervaiz Rashid (2013–2016)
Zahid Hamid (2016–2017)
Usman Ibrahim (2017)
Zafarullah Khan (2017–2018)
Mahmood Basheer Virk (2018)
Syed Zafar Ali Shah (2018)
 Farogh Naseem (2018–2022)
 Fawad Chaudhry (2022)
 Azam Nazeer Tarar (April 2022–October 2022)
Ayaz Sadiq (October -30 Nov 22)
Azam Nazeer Tarar (30 Nov,22- present)

See also
Constitution of Pakistan
Judiciary of Pakistan
Justice minister
Law of Pakistan
Minister of Foreign Affairs (Pakistan)
Ministry of Interior (Pakistan)
Ministry of Law and Justice (Pakistan)
Pakistan Bar Council
Politics of Pakistan
President of Pakistan
Prime Minister of Pakistan

References

External links
 Ministry of Law, Justice & Human Rights

Law Ministers of Pakistan
Ministry of Law and Justice (Pakistan)